The Drugs Control Act, 1950 is an Act of the Parliament of India which regulates the pricing of drugs. It allows the government to fix the maximum price of any drug.

Summary
The Act allows the Government of India to control the sales, supply and distribution of any drug in India. The government can set maximum selling price, maximum quantity to be possessed by dealer and maximum quantity to be sold to one person. The government can impose various restriction of sale.

The Act require any retailer to give a cash memorandum to the customer for any purchase above , and in case the purchase is below  the retailer must give a memo if the customer demands.

The violation of the Act carries a maximum of 3 years with or without fine. In case of corporate violators, every
director, manager, secretary, agent or other officer or person concerned with the management may be prosecuted unless he/she the offence occurred without his/her knowledge. The investigating officer must have the rank of Inspector in the police.

See also
 Drug policy of India
 List of Acts of the Parliament of India

References

Acts of the Parliament of India 1950
Drug control law in India